Clarion is an unincorporated community in Bureau County, Illinois, United States. Clarion is located along a railroad line southwest of Mendota.

Though Clarion is usually perceived as the area where the grain elevator and Lutheran church are located along U.S. Route 34, that is technically known as the unincorporated area of Wendel. Children who live near the railroad crossing known as Clarion attend La Moille schools.

There was once a school house on the southwest corner of the Clarion Blacktop and 2500 N. Avenue. The area is home to several older homesteads and has gently rolling farmland.

References

Unincorporated communities in Bureau County, Illinois
Unincorporated communities in Illinois